"Wish U Were Here" is a song by Australian singer Cody Simpson, featuring vocals from American musician Becky G. The song was released as a digital download on August 7, 2012 as the second single from his debut studio album Paradise (2012). The song was written by Taio Cruz, Dr. Luke, Bonnie McKee, Cirkut and Becky G.

Music video
A music video to accompany the release of "Wish U Were Here" was first released onto YouTube on August 7, 2012 at a total length of three minutes and twenty-eight seconds. The video was directed by Cameron Duddy, who also directed Simpson's video for "Got Me Good", another song featured on Paradise.

Track listing

Chart performance

Weekly charts

Release history

References

2012 singles
2012 songs
Cody Simpson songs
Atlantic Records singles
Songs written by Taio Cruz
Songs written by Dr. Luke
Songs written by Bonnie McKee
Becky G songs
Songs written by Cirkut (record producer)
Songs written by Becky G
Music videos directed by Cameron Duddy